The Warwickshire County Board of the Gaelic Athletic Association (GAA) (or Warwickshire GAA) is one of the county boards outside Ireland, and is responsible for Gaelic games in Warwickshire. The county board is also responsible for the Warwickshire county teams.
Warwickshire have won the Lory Meagher Cup two times. The first victory was in 2013 beating Longford in the hurling final on 8 June 2013 at Croke Park, 2-16 to 0-10. The second in 2017 beating Leitrim on the 10 June 2017 at Croke Park, 0-17 to 0-11. 
Warwickshire again beat Longford to win the Allianz NHL Div 3B hurling final on 4 April 2015 in Ratoath, Meath. Final score: Warwickshire 1-15, Longford 2-10.

Club roll of honour

Hurling

Clubs 

Clubs contest the Warwickshire Senior Hurling Championship.

County team 

In 2005 Warwickshire fielded a hurling team in the Nicky Rackard Cup for the first time. The team was quite successful in 2006, winning one game against Monaghan and losing to Longford and narrowly to Derry who won the competition. In 2007 Warwickshire played in the Leinster Junior Shield and Nicky Rackard Cup ending a good year for the county with wins against Leitrim and Cavan.

In 1970 Warwickshire lost the All-Ireland Intermediate Hurling final to Antrim. Tony Joyce (Antrim) scored probably the most important goal in Warwickshire's history v Monaghan in 2006 to secure their biggest win in the history of the county. Eamon Mahoney is still the most successful manager in the county's history. Warwickshire won their last Provincial All-Britain Championship in 2006 beating Gloucestershire, London en route to beating Scotland in the final.  As a result, they faced Roscommon at Pairc Na h'Éireann on Friday 14 July 2006 when they were soundly beaten.  The Warwickshire squad was:  Dave Tierney, Ian Dooley, Eamonn Hanlon, Michael Hayden, Joseph Dowling (Sean McDermotts), Gavin Farrell, Bobby Scully, Damian Cassidy, David Cunningham, Paul Houston, Michael Hegarty, Kieran Boyle, Eamonn Fallon, Joe Bergin, Brian Higgins, Mel Guinan (Roger Casements), James O'Hara, Alan Armstrong (St. Barnabas), Brian Cuffe, Mark Ryan (Four Masters), Neil Corrigan, Johnny Connaire, Tommy Mooney, Paul Troupe(Various), Mark McLoughlin, Steve McGeer(Various), Peter Healy (John Mitchels).

Honours
Hurling

All-Ireland Junior Hurling Championships: 3
 1968, 1969, 1973
Lory Meagher Cups: 2
 2013, 2017
National Hurling League Division 3A: 1
 2018
National Hurling League Division 3B: 1
 2015

Football

All-Britain Junior Football Championships: 5
 1968, 1969, 1973, 2006, 2021

Schools
Warwickshire Schools GAA Board was originally set up in September 2000. It has grown at a very healthy rate such that as of May 2007 WSGAA now work in partnership with 28 primary schools, 15 Secondary schools, 2 HE/FE Colleges and 5 local GAA clubs and in total an estimated 2385 young people.

The aims of the WSGAA include competition by their elite team in the All-Ireland underage championships. This initiative is a remarkable departure from the traditional way in which British GAA clubs have been organised.

Headquarters
Páirc na hÉireann is the name of the headquarters of Gaelic games in the Birmingham area and more specifically within the remit of the Warwickshire County Board. It is located on the east side of the city close to the Birmingham International Airport.

Notable former players
 Miah Dennehy
 Paddy Grimes
 Dr John McAndrew
 Liam Watson
 Shane "The Horse"Morrissey
Jack Grealish

Clubs
			
FOOTBALL
 Sean McDermott's GFC Birmingham
 St Finbarrs, Coventry
 Naomh Pádraig GAC, Leicester
 Roger Casements GAA, Coventry
 John Mitchells Football Club, Birmingham
 St Barnabas GAA Club, Nottingham
 Erin go Bragh, Birmingham
 St Brendan's GAA Club, Birmingham
 Four Masters, Coventry
 St. Marys GAA Club, Wolverhampton
 St Josephs, Derby
 Sons of Erin, Northampton 
 Rugby Gaels, Rugby
 O'Rahillys GAA, Corby

HURLING

 John Mitchel's
 St Finbarrs (Coventry)
 Erin go Bragh (Birmingham)
 St. Barnabas (Nottingham)
 St Declan’s (Oxford, Hertfordshire)

LADIES FOOTBALL

 John Mitchells Football Club, Birmingham
 Sean McDermotts GFC Birmingham
 St Barnabas GAA Club, Nottingham
 Erin go Bragh, Birmingham
 St Finbarrs Coventry 
 Roger Casements GAA, Coventry

CAMOGIE

 John Mitchel’s
 Erin go Bragh, Birmingham

External links
. Sean McDermotts (birmingham) Warwickshire
 Official Website
 John Mitchels Hurling Club Birmingham
 Naomh Padraig GAA Leicester
 Four Masters GAA Coventry
 St. Barnabas GAC Nottingham
 St. Mary's GAA Club Wolverhampton
 James Connollys GFC
 Britain GAA
 RTÉ report of London GAA and Warwickshire GAA

 
British GAA
Gaelic games governing bodies in the United Kingdom
Sport in Warwickshire